yelworC was an electro-industrial band from Germany.

The group was formed in 1987 by Peter Devin and Oliver Büttner (a.k.a. Dominik van Reich). Their name is derived from the name of Aleister Crowley, and their music reflects themes of dark magic, religious rituals, death, and violence.

History
The duo put out a number of demo tapes in 1988–1990 until they were finally signed to the now defunct Celtic Circle Productions (C.C.P.) recording label and released their first full-length CD album Brainstorming in 1993.

Their music consists of gloomy synthesizers mixed with abrasive dance-beats, overlaid with distorted vocals and the occasional audio sample taken from various horror films. The musical result is a style akin to Skinny Puppy, that has inspired many other groups in the electro-industrial and gothic genres.

In 1994, after what looked like a promising career, yelworC unexpectedly split up, with van Reich heading off to form the more experimental sounding amGod ("dogma" backwards) and cutting one album Half Rotten and Decayed under the C.C.P. label. Devin fought and successfully kept the rights to use the name yelworC.

In 2004 Devin released a new studio album entitled Trinity; the first release from yelworC in over ten years. The album, containing some material composed during the late 1990s, is based on Dante's journey through Hell as told in the first part of The Divine Comedy, Inferno. It features a guest appearance by Dennis Ostermann of In Strict Confidence on the song Vexilla Regis Inferni.

A third album "Icolation" was released in October 2007. It continued the concept of Trinity, using themes from the second part of The Divine Comedy, Purgatorio.

Discography
"Rising as Phoenix from its Ashes" (1988) cassette demo
"The Mystery Side of Democracy" (1988) cassette demo
 "Flash, Wards, and Incubation" (1989) cassette demo
 "Dis-Cover and Con-Trol" (1989) cassette demo
 "A.I.W.A.S.S." (1990) cassette demo
"Satanat" (1991) (Danse Macabre) cassette compilation 1987 – 1990
 "Tanatas" (1991) (Danse Macabre) cassette single
 "Brainstorming"(1992) (C.C.P./Semaphore) CD album
 "Blood in Face" (1993) (C.C.P./EFA) CD EP
 "Brainstorming" (1994) (C.C.P./EFA) CD album reissue
 "Collection: 1988 – 1994" (1995) (C.C.P./EFA) 2xCD compilation
 "Trinity" (2004) (Baal Records, Minuswelt Musikfabrik/Soulfood, Metropolis Records) CD album
 "Eclosion" (2007) (Baal Records, Minuswelt Musikfabrik/Soulfood) CD EP
 "Icolation" (2007) (Baal Records, Minuswelt Musikfabrik/Soulfood, Metropilos Records) CD album

Compilation appearances
 "Art & Dance 4" (1993) (Discordia) CD track#3 "Deadly Visions" and track #4 "Legion"
 "Celtic Circle Sampler Part One" (1993) (Celtic Circle Productions) 2xCD disc #1 track #6 "Crucified West"
 "Electronic Youth Vol. 1" (1993) (Music Research) CD track #1 "Chains (Rapture Fear Mix)"
 "German Mystic Sound Sampler Volume IV" (1993) (Zillo) LP side B track #2/CD track #8 "Sacred City"
 "Body Rapture Vol. 3" (1994) (Zoth Ommog) CD track #13 "Recall"
 "Celtic Circle Sampler Part Two" (1994) (Celtic Circle Productions) 2xCD disc #2 track #11 "Combat (Remix)"
 "Essence of ConSequence" (1994) (ConSequence Records) CD track #11 "Red Sun"
 "Living for Music" (1994) (Discordia) CD rack #6 "Blood In Face"
 "Moonraker" (1994) (Sub Terranean) 2xCD disc #1 track 7 "Soulhunter"
 "Celtic Circle Sampler Part Three" (1995) (Celtic Circle Productions) 2xCD disc #2 track #11 "Crucifixion Of Scarlet Angel (Remix)"
 "Taste This 4" (1995) (Discordia) 2xCD disc #1 track #3 "Prodigies of Black"
 "Vertigo Compilation 01/1996" (1996) (Celtic Circle Productions) CD track #7 "Spy vs. Spy (Remix)"
 "14 Years of Electronic Challenge Vol. II" (1997) (COP International) CD track #14 "Blood In Face"
 "Zillo Mystic Sounds 4" (1998) (Zillo) track #8 "Sacred City" Note: band named misspelled as Yelwork
 "Proven In Action" (2003) (First Aid Recordings) CD track #10 "Triune Junction"
 ":Per:Version: Vol. 10" (2004) (:Ritual:) CD Enhanced w/mp3s track #5 "Triune Junction"
 "Cortex Compilation Vol. 1" (2004) (Minuswelt Musikfabrik) CD track #1 "Without Remorse"
 "Sonic Seducer Cold Hands Seduction Vol. 34" (2004) (Sonic Seducer) 2xCD Enhanced w/videos disc #1 track # 2 "Bloodwhited Cut"
 "Endzeit Bunkertracks [Act 1]" (2005) (Alfa Matrix) 4xCD Box Set disc #4 track #1 "Doom of Choronzon"
 "Old School Electrology Volume One" (2011) (Electro Aggression Records) 4xCD Box Set disc #3 track #9 "Teufels Dreizack Part I"

Video compilation appearance
 "Delta-O : Electro-Wave Compilation" (Veni, Vidi, Descripsi) VHS video #8 "Sacred City"

References

External links
yelworC Official site (German)
yelworC myspace with samples of music

German electronic music groups
Musical groups established in 1987
German industrial music groups
Electro-industrial music groups
Metropolis Records artists